Fensulfothion is an insecticide and nematicide.  It is highly toxic and listed as an extremely hazardous substance. It is widely used on corn, onions, rutabagas, pineapple, bananas, sugar cane, sugar beets, pea nuts, etc.

External links

References

Organophosphate insecticides
Ethyl esters
Sulfoxides
Nematicides